= Newton Liu =

Newton Liu or Liu Yaochang (traditional Chinese: 劉堯昌; simplified Chinese: 刘尧昌; Wade–Giles: Liu Yao-chʽang; 1900–1977) was an Anglican Bishop in China. He was consecrated Bishop of Shensi in the Church of the Holy Nativity Wuchang on 28 October 1947.
